.kg is the Internet country code top-level domain (ccTLD) for Kyrgyzstan. Although registrations are normally at the second level, there are some specialized third-level registrations such as those under gov.kg and mil.kg.

Second-Level Domain Names
 .org.kg
 .net.kg
 .com.kg
 .edu.kg
 .gov.kg
 .mil.kg

External links
 IANA .kg whois information
 .kg domain registration website

Country code top-level domains
Internet in Kyrgyzstan

sv:Toppdomän#K